DCU Students' Union (DCUSU) is a students' union representing Dublin City University (DCU) students. DCUSU provides social events and activities for undergraduate students and is also involved in the provision of some services including counselling and an official representation pathway between students and university authorities. DCUSU has offices located in 'The U' on the Glasnevin campus and also on St Patrick's Campus, the major Drumcondra campus.  DCUSU is governed by a written constitution approved by the members and the university's Governing Body.

Role
The roles of the Union include acting as a representative channel between students and DCU authorities, and providing social activities for students. All full-time and part-time students of DCU are members of the Students' Union.

DCU's associated colleges, All Hallows College, Mater Dei Institute of Education, and St Patrick's College, had their own student representation before the DCU incorporation and are now represented by the same body.

Governance
DCUSU is governed by a constitution. Amendments to the constitution may be passed after a referendum. For example, in March 2017 a referendum was held to change the constitution, with 1,731 students voting in favour. Referendums in 2016 resulted in the Students' Union declaring a pro-choice stance on abortion, and support for legalisation of cannabis use by adults.

Although there is no formal or full-time Postgraduate Students' Union present in DCU, the formation of a Postgraduate Students' Union has been discussed since 2012 and in 2017, the Class Representative Council mandated the President to develop a framework for a Postgraduate Students' Union.

Funding and affiliation
The Students' Union is funded through the Office of Student Life (OSL), which is overseen by an Executive, a committee made up of students and university staff. As of 2017, the OSL supports and sponsors over 140 student run clubs and societies.

DCU Students' Union is a member of the Union of Students in Ireland. Having voted to disaffiliate in 2002, a referendum which took place in March 2013, where the student body had voted to re-affiliate with USI, was declared void by then Students' Union President Paul Doherty. He questioned the constitutionality of the vote, alleging that the students' union executive did not run an information campaign for the referendum. This nullification was criticised by USI, which blamed a "small cohort" in DCU for the nullification. While a referendum on USI membership in February 2014 was passed by only one vote, a majority of students voted to remain affiliated with USI in December 2016.

References

External links
 DCU Students' Union website
 DCU Postgraduate Students' website

Dublin City University
Students' unions in Ireland
1975 establishments in Ireland